Robert Michael John Fox (born 25 March 1952) is an English theatre and film producer, whose work includes the 2002 film The Hours.

Life and career
He was born the third son of theatrical agent Robin Fox and actress Angela Worthington. He is the younger brother of actors Edward Fox and James Fox. The actress Emilia Fox is his niece and the actors Laurence Fox and Freddie Fox are his nephews. His maternal grandfather was playwright Frederick Lonsdale. Fox was educated at Harrow School.

Fox has been a theatrical producer in the West End and on Broadway for over two decades.
His productions include Another Country, Burn This starring John Malkovich; the world premiere of Arthur Miller's The Ride Down Mt. Morgan; Edward Albee's Three Tall Women; many plays by David Hare: Skylight with Michael Gambon and Lia Williams, Amy's View with Judi Dench, and The Breath of Life with Maggie Smith and Judi Dench.
Other Fox productions include Hedda Gabler, Closer by Patrick Marber, The Lady in the Van by Alan Bennett starring Maggie Smith and directed by Nicholas Hytner; a revival of Pinter's The Caretaker with Michael Gambon, Gypsy on Broadway; The Boy from Oz starring Hugh Jackman; and The Pillowman by Martin McDonagh starring Billy Crudup and Jeff Goldblum.
Fox is currently co-producing two new plays: on Broadway, The Vertical Hour by David Hare starring Julianne Moore and Bill Nighy, and in the West End, Frost/Nixon by Peter Morgan with Frank Langella and Michael Sheen at the Gielgud Theatre.

Fox executive-produced the film of Closer, directed by Mike Nichols and starring Julia Roberts, Jude Law, Clive Owen and Natalie Portman. Before that, he produced The Hours with Scott Rudin, directed by Stephen Daldry, starring Nicole Kidman, Meryl Streep and Julianne Moore; and Iris (Miramax/Mirage) directed by Richard Eyre, starring Judi Dench, Kate Winslet and Jim Broadbent, both of which garnered Oscars in 2003. Other credits include executive producer on Another Country; a television film of Suddenly, Last Summer with Maggie Smith; and A Month by the Lake for starring Vanessa Redgrave, Edward Fox and Uma Thurman. He co-produced Notes on a Scandal for Fox Searchlight starring Cate Blanchett and Judi Dench.

Personal life
Fox is married to Fiona Golfar, with whom he has two children, Joe and Molly. He was previously married to Celestia Sporborg, with whom he had three children, Chloe, Sam and Louisa, and to the actress Natasha Richardson from 1990–1992.

References

External links

1952 births
People educated at Harrow School
People from Cuckfield
English film producers
English theatre managers and producers
Living people
Robin Fox family
Golden Globe Award-winning producers